{{Automatic taxobox
|fossil_range=
|image=Colus islandicus 001.jpg
|image_caption=Two shells of Colus islandicus
|taxon=Colus
|authority=Röding, 1798
|type_species=Murex islandicus
|type_species_authority=Mohr, 1786
|synonyms_ref=
|synonyms=
 Atractus Agassiz, 1839 (invalid: junior homonym of Atractus Wagler, 1828 [Reptilia]; also junior objective synonym of Colus)
 Chrysodomus (Sipho) Mörch, 1852
 Chrysodomus (Siphonorbis) Mörch, 1869  (junior synonym)
 Colus (Latifusus) Dall, 1916
 Fusus (Colus) Röding, 1798
 Fusus (Sipho) Mörch, 1852
 Fusus (Siphonorbis) Mörch, 1869(original rank)
 Neptunea (Sipho) Mörch, 1852
 Neptunea (Siphonorbis) Mörch, 1869
 Plicifusus (Latifusus) Dall, 1916
 Sipho Mörch, 1852
 Sipho (Siphonorbis) Mörch, 1869 
 Sipho (Tritonofusus) Beck, 1847 
 Siphonorbis Mörch, 1869
 Tritonofusus Beck, 1847
}}Colus (lat. colus, distaff) is a genus of sea snails, marine gastropod mollusks in the family Colidae, the true whelks and the like.

EvolutionColus is related to the New Zealand genus Austrofusus.

Taxonomy
The name Colus is not available from Humphrey, 1797 (published in a work placed on the Official Index). Most recent authors use the name Colus  for the genus instead of Sipho . Iredale (1919b) mentioned: "This name cannot be defended by anyone" and was rejected by the ICZN (Op. 21). Also Tritonofusus  cannot be used because of the rules of priority.

Species
Species within the genus Colus include:
 Colus aurariae Fraussen,  Rosado, Afonso & Monteiro, 2009
 Colus azygosorius Tiba, 1980
 Colus barbarinus Dall, 1919
 Colus bukini Kantor, 1984
 Colus gracilis (da Costa, 1778)
 Colus griseus (Dall, 1889)
 Colus halimeris (Dall, 1919)
 Colus holboelli (Møller, 1842)
 Colus islandicus (Mohr, 1786)
 Colus jeffreysianus (Fischer P., 1868)
 Colus kujianus Tiba, 1973
 Colus minor (Dall, 1925): synonym of Plicifusus minor (Dall, 1925)
 Colus pubescens (A. E. Verrill, 1882)
 Colus pulcius (Dall, 1919)
 Colus pygmaeus (Gould, 1841)
 Colus rushii (Dall, 1889)
 Colus sabini (Gray J.E., 1824)
 †Colus sekiuensis Kiel & Goedert, 2007 
 Colus stimpsoni (Mørch, 1868)
 Colus syrtensis (Packard, 1867)
 Colus terraenovae Bouchet & Warén, 1985
 Colus turgidulus (Friele, 1877)
 Colus virgulus Paulmier, 2020
Taxon inquirendum
 Colus (Aulacofusus) halidonus (Dall, 1919)

 Species represented in the fossil record
 †Colus altus †Colus gracilis †Colus hollboelli †Colus islandicus †Colus pygmaeus †Colus stimpsoniSynonyms
 
 Colus acosmius (Dall, 1891): synonym of Anomalisipho acosmius (Dall, 1891)
 Colus adonis Dall, 1919: synonym of Kanamarua adonis (Dall, 1919) (original combination)
  † Colus altus (S. Wood, 1848): synonym of † Murex pullus S. Woodward, 1833 
 Colus aphelus (Dall, 1890): synonym of Latisipho aphelus (Dall, 1890)
 Colus aurantius (Dall, 1907): synonym of Plicifusus rhyssus (Dall, 1907)
 Colus boardmani Iredale, 1930: synonym of Fusinus colus (Linnaeus, 1758)
 Colus brevicauda (Deshayes, 1832): synonym of Aulacofusus brevicauda (Deshayes, 1832)
 Colus bristolensis Dall, 1919: synonym of Colus barbarinus Dall, 1919
 Colus brunneus (Dall, 1877): synonym of Retifusus jessoensis (Schrenck, 1863)
 Colus caelatus (A. E. Verrill, 1880): synonym of Retimohnia caelata (A. E. Verrill, 1880)
 Colus calamaeus (Dall, 1907): synonym of Aulacofusus calamaeus (Dall, 1907)
 Colus calathus Dall, 1919: synonym of Aulacofusus calathus (Dall, 1919) (original combination)
 Colus callorhinus (Dall, 1877): synonym of Plicifusus rodgersi (Gould, 1860)
 Colus capponius Dall, 1919: synonym of Colus pulcius (Dall, 1919)
 Colus clementinus Dall, 1919: synonym of Retimohnia clarki (Dall, 1907)
 Colus consetti Iredale, 1929: synonym of Fusinus consetti (Iredale, 1929)
 Colus cretaceus (Reeve, 1847): synonym of Plicifusus kroyeri (Møller, 1842)
 Colus dautzenbergi Dall, 1916: synonym of Anomalisipho verkruezeni (Kobelt, 1876)
 Colus errones Dall, 1919: synonym of Latisipho errones (Dall, 1919)
 Colus esychus (Dall, 1907): synonym of Aulacofusus esychus (Dall, 1907)
 Colus forceps (Perry, 1811): synonym of Fusinus forceps (Perry, 1811)
 Colus frielei (Kantor, 1981)>: synonym of Anomalosipho frielei Kantor, 1981: synonym of Anomalisipho verkruezeni (Kobelt, 1876)
 Colus fusiformis (Broderip, 1830): synonym of Turrisipho fenestratus (W. Turton, 1834)
 Colus genticus Iredale, 1936: synonym of Cyrtulus genticus (Iredale, 1936) (original combination)
 Colus georgianus (Dall, 1921): synonym of Latisipho georgianus (Dall, 1921)
 Colus glaber (Verkrüzen, 1876): synonym of Colus gracilis (da Costa, 1778)
 Colus glyptus (A. E. Verrill, 1882): synonym of Retimohnia glypta (A. E. Verrill, 1882)
 Colus halibrectus (Dall, 1891): synonym of Latisipho halibrectus (Dall, 1891)
 Colus hallii (Dall, 1873): synonym of Latisipho hallii (Dall, 1873)
 Colus hankinsi A. H. Clarke, 1960: synonym of Mohnia danielsseni (Friele, 1879)
 Colus hayashii Shikama, 1971: synonym of Calagrassor hayashii (Shikama, 1971) (original combination)
 Colus herendeenii (Dall, 1902): synonym of Aulacofusus herendeeni (Dall, 1902)
 Colus holbolli (Møller, 1842): synonym of Colus holboelli (Møller, 1842)
 Colus howsei (J. T. Marshall, 1902): synonym of Colus jeffreysianus (P. Fischer, 1868)
 Colus hunkinsi A. H. Clarke, 1960: synonym of Mohnia danielsseni (Friele, 1879) 
 Colus hypolispus (Dall, 1891): synonym of Latisipho hypolispus (Dall, 1891)
 Colus incisus (Dall, 1919): synonym of Plicifusus olivaceus (Aurivillius, 1885)
 Colus jessoensis (Schrenck, 1863): synonym of Retifusus jessoensis (Schrenck, 1863)
 Colus jordani (Dall, 1913): synonym of Latisipho jordani (Dall, 1913)
 † Colus kaunhoweni Finlay, 1927: synonym of † Columbarium heberti (Briart & Cornet, 1877) 
 Colus krampi (Thorson, 1951): synonym of Mohnia krampi (Thorson, 1951)
 Colus kroeyeir (Møller, 1842): synonym of Plicifusus kroyeri (Møller, 1842)
 Colus kroyeri (Møller, 1842): synonym of Plicifusus kroyeri (Møller, 1842)
 Colus lachesis (Mörch, 1869): synonym of Turrisipho lachesis (Mörch, 1869)
 Colus latericeus (Møller, 1842): synonym of Retifusus latericeus (Møller, 1842)
 Colus longicauda (Lamarck, 1801): synonym of Fusinus colus (Linnaeus, 1758)
 Colus martensi (A. Krause, 1885): synonym of Anomalisipho martensi (A. Krause, 1885)
 Colus minor (Dall, 1925): synonym of Plicifusus minor (Dall, 1925)
 Colus mitrellaformis Nomura, 1940: synonym of Daphnella mitrellaformis (Nomura, 1940) (original combination)
 Colus nobilis Dall, 1919: synonym of Aulacofusus herendeeni (Dall, 1902)
 Colus obesus (A. E. Verrill, 1884): synonym of Retimohnia caelata (A. E. Verrill, 1880)
 Colus oceanodromae (Dall, 1919): synonym of Plicifusus oceanodromae Dall, 1919
 Colus okhotskanus Tiba, 1973: synonym of Plicifusus elaeodes (Dall, 1907)
 Colus ombronius Dall, 1919: synonym of Aulacofusus ombronius (Dall, 1919) (original combination)
 Colus parvus (Tiba, 1980): synonym of Retifusus parvus (Tiba, 1980)
 Colus periscelidus (Dall, 1891): synonym of Aulacofusus periscelidus (Dall, 1891)
 Colus roseus (Dall, 1877): synonym of Retifusus roseus (Dall, 1877)
 Colus ryukyuensis Lan, 2002: synonym of Calagrassor poppei (Fraussen, 2001)
 Colus sapius Dall, 1919: synonym of Fusipagoda sapia (Dall, 1919) (original combination)
 Colus severinus (Dall, 1919): synonym of Latisipho severinus (Dall, 1919)
 Colus sinovellus Iredale, 1929: synonym of Fusinus sinovellus (Iredale, 1929) (original combination)
 Colus spitzbergensis (Reeve, 1855): synonym of Aulacofusus brevicauda (Deshayes, 1832)
 Colus stejnegeri (Dall, 1884): synonym of Turrivolutopsius stejnegeri (Dall, 1884): synonym of Volutopsius stejnegeri (Dall, 1884)
 Colus tahwitanus Dall, 1918: synonym of Latisipho tahwitanus (Dall, 1918) (original combination)
 Colus tashiensis Y.-C. Lee & T. C. Lan, 2002: synonym of Calagrassor tashiensis (Y.-C. Lee & T. C. Lan, 2002) (original combination)
 Colus timetus (Dall, 1919): synonym of Latisipho timetus (Dall, 1919)
 Colus togatus (Mörch, 1869): synonym of Colus sabini (J. E. Gray, 1824)
 Colus tortuosus (Reeve, 1855): synonym of Colus holboelli (Møller, 1842)
 Colus trombinus (Dall, 1919): synonym of Limatofusus trombinus (Dall, 1919)
 Colus trophius (Dall, 1919): synonym of Aulacofusus trophius Dall, 1919
 Colus ventricosus (Gray, 1839): synonym of Colus terraenovae Bouchet & Warén, 1985
 Colus verkruezeni (Kobelt, 1876): synonym of Anomalisipho verkruezeni (Kobelt, 1876)
 Colus virens (Dall, 1877): synonym of Retifusus virens (Dall, 1877)

References

 Bouchet P. & Warén A. (1985). Revision of the Northeast Atlantic bathyal and abyssal Neogastropoda excluding Turridae (Mollusca, Gastropoda)''. Bollettino Malacologico Suppl. 1: 121-296

External links
 

Buccinidae
Gastropod genera